Sancia is a given name. Notable people with the name include:

Sancia of Aragon (1478–1506), also known as Sancha, Princess of Squillace
Sancia of Majorca (c. 1285 – 28 July 1345), Queen of Naples
Sancia di Castiglia, eponymous heroine of 1832 opera by Donizetti